Alan Beaumont (9 January 1927 – 1999) was an English footballer.

Beaumont made five appearances in The Football League during 1948–49 for Chester but did not play for the club again. He had previously played for South Liverpool and later joined New Brighton.

In the 1956–57 season he played three times for Mossley.

Bibliography

References

1927 births
1999 deaths
Footballers from Liverpool
English Football League players
Association football midfielders
English footballers
South Liverpool F.C. players
Chester City F.C. players
New Brighton A.F.C. players
Mossley A.F.C. players